The Song Remembers When is the third studio album by American country music artist Trisha Yearwood. The album was released October 26, 1993 on MCA Nashville Records and was produced by Garth Fundis. It was Yearwood's third collaboration with Fundis, who also produced her 1992 album, Hearts in Armor which received wide critical acclaim, as well as her platinum-selling eponymous debut. The title track was the album's lead single, becoming a major hit, peaking at #2 on the Hot Country Singles & Tracks chart in 1993.

Background
The Song Remembers When was recorded in Nashville, Tennessee in 1993 and contained ten tracks. Thom Jurek of Allmusic called the content "contemporary country" and "top notch no matter where the pair get it from." John McAlley of Rolling Stone called The Song Remembers When'''s tone "somber." McAlley goes on to explain that, "Love (Sort of) Stinks" might have been a more apt title for this album, such are the voices of heartache, spite and uncertainty that permeate it. So total, in fact, is its focus on the tribulations of romantic love that Song resembles a concept record." The album opens with the title track, which was described by Jurek as "innocent love gone bad." The second song, "Better Your Heart Than Mine," which was written by Lisa Angelle and Andrew Gold was said to evoke the Rock-inspired style of Bonnie Raitt, according to Jurek. The third track, "I Don't Fall In Love So Easy" features background vocals from Rodney Crowell, who also wrote the song.

Most of the songs included on the album are further recorded in a country pop style, including "The Nightingale" and "Lying to the Moon." The album includes two cover versions. The first is a cover of Linda Ronstadt's "Mr. Radio," one of Yearwood's major influences. McAlley called "Mr. Radio" a "reverent cover" of Ronstadt's song. The second cover is Willie Nelson's 1966 single, "One In a Row," in which Nelson performs a guitar solo. In addition, Nelson also contributed his vocals to another track on the album, "Here Comes Temptation." Matraca Berg's "Lying to the Moon" (originally recorded by Berg on her 1990 album of the same name) was considered by McAlley to be, "the hit-bound title track so undeniably sad that songs intended to offer reconciliation and uplift." He further stated that "The Nightingale" and "I Don't Fall In Love So Easy" to also possess what "Lying to the Moon" has, stating they, "buckle under their own ambivalence and the album's cumulative weight."

Critical reception

John McAlley of Rolling Stone gave The Song Remembers When three out of five stars, giving his reasons for this by stating, "To say a record is downbeat is not to say it is bad. Without exception, the neocountry music on Song is accessible, state-of-the-art and brilliantly played and arranged. But for the 29-year-old singer, The Song Remembers When is not the rich showcase she had on her two previous albums. For all its grit, there is a middle-of-the-road quality about Song that is disconcerting. And its lesser material feels secondhand. There is little of the spontaneity and few of the interpretive leaps that have made Yearwood's vocal gift so arresting." Allmusic's Thom Jurek gave it a higher review, giving it four out of five stars. Jurek praised the album more highly, stating, "It's poetry, this combination of singer and song. She couldn't sing it any better if she'd written it; the accents create tension and drama and images from every betrayed-lover's movie from the '40s on, washing through the mix. Only a real singer can deliver the image from the heart of the song. Yearwood here is the heart of the song itself."

CD Universe also reviewed The Song Remembers When, where it received five out of five stars. The website considered that many of the tracks combined with Yearwood's vocals, "shows the artistry of what an accomplished interpreter can create with a strong melody." CD Universe called the tracks, "The Song Remembers When" and "The Nightingale" the album's highlights.

Release and aftermath
The lead single off The Song Remembers When was the title track. Released in 1993, the song became a major hit, peaking at #2 on Billboard's Hot Country Singles & Tracks chart, while also becoming her first single to chart within the Billboard Hot 100, peaking at #82. The album's second and final single, "Better Your Heart Than Mine" was released in 1994, becoming her first single to miss the Top 20, reaching #21. The Song Remembers When reached a peak of #6 on the Billboard'' Top Country Albums chart, while also peaking at #40 on the Billboard 200 albums chart as well. In December 1993, the album was certified gold, and in December 1994, it was certified by platinum in sales by the Recording Industry Association of America. It was nominated for Best Country Album at the 37th Grammy Awards.

Track listing

Personnel 

 Trisha Yearwood – lead vocals, backing vocals (1, 7, 9)
  Steve Nathan – acoustic piano (1, 3), organ (3), keyboards (6)
 Matt Rollings – keyboards (2), acoustic piano (4-10)
 Billy Joe Walker, Jr. – acoustic guitar (1, 2, 3, 5, 7-10)
 Brent Mason – electric guitar (1, 7, 8, 10)
 Steuart Smith – electric guitar (2, 3, 5, 7, 9)
 George Marinelli – electric guitar (4, 9)
 Paul Franklin – steel guitar (1, 3, 4, 5, 7-10), slide guitar (2), dobro (4), pedabro (10)
 Jerry Douglas – dobro (6)
 Dave Pomeroy – bass (1-5, 7-10)
 Milton Sledge – drums (1, 3, 8, 10)
 Eddie Bayers – drums (2, 4, 5, 7, 9)
 Rob Hajacos – fiddle (2, 5, 7, 8)
 Carl Marsh – string arrangements
 Lisa Angelle – backing vocals (2)
 Andrew Gold – backing vocals (2)
 Rodney Crowell – backing vocals (3)
 Garth Fundis – backing vocals (3)
 Willie Nelson – backing vocals (4), acoustic guitar solo (8)
 Raul Malo – backing vocals (5, 9)
 Lisa Silver – backing vocals (5, 8)
 Thom Flora – backing vocals (8)

Production 
 Garth Fundis – producer, mixing 
 Gary Laney – engineer, mix assistant
 Dave Sinko – engineer, mix assistant
 Ken Hutton – assistant engineer, mix assistant
 Denny Purcell – mastering 
 Georgetown Masters (Nashville, Tennessee) – mastering location 
 Scott Paschall – production assistant
 Buddy Jackson – art direction, design
 Jim Kemp – art direction
 Beth Middleworth – design 
 George Holz – cover photography 
 Susan Schelling – photography
 Sheri McCoy – stylist 
 Maria Smoot – hair stylist
 Mary Beth Felts – make-up

Charts

Weekly charts

Certifications

Year-end charts

Singles

References

1993 albums
Albums produced by Garth Fundis
MCA Records albums
Trisha Yearwood albums